Miloš Milačić (born 26 July 1980), is a Serbian futsal player who plays for KMF Kopernikus and the Serbia national futsal team.

References

External links
UEFA profile

1980 births
Living people
Serbian men's futsal players